The Maserati 8CTF is an open-wheel Grand Prix motor racing car, designed, developed and built by Italian manufacturer Maserati, from 1938 to 1939. To date, it remains the only Italian-made car to win the Indianapolis 500 (excluding Dallara, which only supplies the chassis to the teams; but not the engines).

Racing and competitive history

The model was created after Adolfo Orsi took over Maserati, thus solving the economic problems that the car manufacturer of the trident had. Ernesto Maserati was no longer so constrained by budgetary issues in the design of his models, and conceived a supercharged 3 -liter where, for this type of fuel, he had accumulated good experience . The abbreviation "8CTF" means:

8C: the total number of cylinders, which were eight;
T: Head;
F: Fixed.

Its main feature was in having an independent power supply for each series of four cylinders . It therefore fitted two Roots -type compressors . After subsequent improvements, in 1939, the engine came to deliver a power of 366 hp. Another peculiarity that the 8CTF possessed was that the oil tank also acted as a central cross member of the frame.

The model debuted on May 15, 1938, at the Tripoli Grand Prix with excellent performance but failing in the final result. Due to the approach of the Second World War, the races thinned out considerably, thus compromising the development of the car.

With Wilbur Shaw at the wheel, the 8CTF won two editions of the Indianapolis 500, in 1939 and 1940. The car that won the two editions of the prestigious competition was nicknamed Boyle Special.

Design
The ignition was single with spark type magnet. The feeding was forced with two Roots-type compressors coupled to two Memini and MA12 model carburetors mounted upstream of the compressors themselves. The distribution was with two valves per cylinder arranged at 90°, with double overhead camshafts. Lubrication was forced with delivery and recovery pumps. The cooling system was water circulation with a centrifugal pump.

The bore and stroke were 69mm and 100mm respectively, while the compression ratio was 6.5:1. The maximum power output was between 350 and 366 hp at 6300 rpm.

The brakes were drum brakes on the wheels with hydraulic control. The front suspensions were with independent wheels and torsion bars, while the rear ones were with leaf springs . Both were also fitted with a stabilizer bar and friction shock absorbers (hydraulic for the latter). The steering was worm screw with toothed sector, while the transmission consisted of a four- speed gearbox plus reverse.

The body was an open-wheel design, covered in aluminum, while the chassis was made up of two side members in steel profiles with crossbars.

References

8CTF
Grand Prix cars